Rydebäck is a bimunicipal locality situated in Helsingborg Municipality and Landskrona Municipality in Skåne County, Sweden with 6,480 inhabitants in 2020.

References 

Populated places in Helsingborg Municipality
Populated places in Landskrona Municipality
Populated places in Skåne County